In geometry, the stellated truncated hexahedron (or quasitruncated hexahedron, and stellatruncated cube) is a uniform star polyhedron, indexed as U19. It has 14 faces (8 triangles and 6 octagrams), 36 edges, and 24 vertices. It is represented by Schläfli symbol t'{4,3} or t{4/3,3}, and Coxeter-Dynkin diagram, . It is sometimes called quasitruncated hexahedron because it is related to the truncated cube, except that the square faces become inverted into {8/3} octagrams.

Even though the stellated truncated hexahedron is a stellation of the truncated hexahedron, its core is a regular octahedron.

Orthographic projections

Related polyhedra
It shares the vertex arrangement with three other uniform polyhedra: the convex rhombicuboctahedron, the small rhombihexahedron, and the small cubicuboctahedron.

See also
 List of uniform polyhedra

References

External links
 

Uniform polyhedra